The Huanchaca mouse or Huanchaca akodont (Juscelinomys huanchacae) is a rodent species in the family Cricetidae.

Description
The individual hairs on the back and flanks have grey bases, dark shafts and either black or yellowish tips. The ventral pelage is grey or yellowish buff. The sides of the muzzle and the chin are pale and the ears are well clad with short, pale-tipped hairs and fringed with pale-coloured hairs. The feet are clad with dark hairs with whitish tips. The tail is well-covered with stiff, dark-coloured hairs on the upper surface and paler hairs underneath.

Distribution and habitat
This mouse is endemic to eastern Bolivia.

Ecology
The Huanchaca mouse feeds on invertebrates, such as ants and insect larvae, and on some plant material. Females are often pregnant or lactating in the late dry season or at the start of the rainy season, but it may breed over a longer period as little sampling has taken place at other times of year. Litter sizes range from one to three. This mouse is quite easy to trap in a Sherman trap, but seems very prone to shed its tail, with many specimens having short tails or stumps. There seem to be large population swings; for example, in one location, the previously-present animal apparently disappeared for three years before reappearing. Such changes in population size  may lead to local extinctions.

Status
The International Union for Conservation of Nature (IUCN) has described the conservation status of this species as "data deficient", because there is insufficient information available to make a proper assessment. The rough grassland where it occurs is threatened by cattle grazing, and some surrounding areas are being cultivated for the production of biofuels, putting the future of this mouse at risk.

References

External sources

 Animal Diversity Web

Juscelinomys
Rodents of South America
Mammals of Bolivia
Endemic fauna of Bolivia
Mammals described in 1999